Dezső Csejtei (born April 19, 1951) is a Hungarian philosopher and professor of philosophy at the University of Szeged.
Dezső is known for his expertise on hermeneutics, philosophy of history and theology. He is a former president of Hungarian Philosophical Society.

References

External links
 Dezső Csejtei Personal Website

Phenomenologists
Continental philosophers
Philosophy academics
Heidegger scholars
Living people
1951 births
University of Szeged alumni
Academic staff of the University of Szeged
Hungarian philosophers
Eötvös Loránd University alumni
People from Szeged
Hungarian translators
Spanish–Hungarian translators
German–Hungarian translators
Hermeneutists
Nietzsche scholars
Philosophers of history